Aigremont may refer to:

Persons
Édouard Michel du Faing d'Aigremont (1855–1931), a Belgian army officer and general during World War I
Guillaume François d'Aigremont, (1770–1827), a French general de brigade (brigadier general)

Places

Canada
 Aigremont Lake, Quebec

France
 Aigremont, Gard, in the Gard department
 Aigremont, Haute-Marne, in the Haute-Marne department
 Aigremont, Yonne, in the Yonne department
 Aigremont, Yvelines, in the Yvelines department